Bolshesidorovskoye is a rural locality (a selo) and the administrative center of Bolshesidorovskoye Rural Settlement of Krasnogvardeysky District, Adygea, Russia. The population was 1538 as of 2018. There are 14 streets.

Geography 
Bolshesidorovskoye is located on the Psenapha River, 25 km southeast of Krasnogvardeyskoye (the district's administrative centre) by road. Arkhipovskoye is the nearest rural locality.

References 

Rural localities in Krasnogvardeysky District